Raghu or Reghu is an Indian masculine given name. Notable people with the name include:
A. T. Raghu, Indian director, producer, screenplay writer and actor.
Bheeman Raghu (born 1953), Indian film actor
M. V. Raghu, Indian film cinematographer, director, screenwriter, and producer
Palghat R. Raghu (1928–2009), Indian Carnatic musician and percussionist
R. Raghu, Indian film director and television producer 
Raghu Babu, Telugu comedian 
Raghu Dixit, Indian singer-songwriter, producer, and film score composer 
Raghu Karnad, Indian journalist and writer 
Raghu Karumanchi, Indian actor 
Raghu Kunche, Indian film music director, playback singer and actor 
Raghu Mukherjee, Indian Kannada film actor and model 
Raghu Ram (born 1973), Indian television producer and actor 
Raghu Ramakrishnan, Indian researcher in the areas of database and information management 
Raghu Veera Reddy (born 1957), Indian politician
Reghu Kumar (1953–2014), Indian music composer
Raghu Rai (born 1942), Indian photographer and photojournalist
Raghu Raj Bahadur (1924–1997), Indian statistician 
Dinesh Raghu Raman, Indian military officer
Raghu Ram Pillarisetti, Indian oncoplastic breast surgeon
Raghu Vira (1902–1963), Indian linguist, scholar and politician 
Rangayana Raghu (born 1965), Indian film and stage actor

Indian masculine given names